Peter Lauritzen (born 8 December 1959 in Århus) is a Danish civil servant. 

He was the fourth High Commissioner of Greenland, and held the post from 1 April 2002 to 30 March 2005.  

From 1 January 2007, he became director of Roskilde Universitetscenter, taking over from Lars Kirdan. He has an MA in political science and MA in comparative studies, and was formerly ministerial secretary for Prime Minister Poul Nyrup Rasmussen, and research assistant and lecturer at Københavns Universitet.

References

 

Danish civil servants
1959 births
People from Aarhus
Academic staff of the University of Copenhagen
Living people
High Commissioners of Greenland